Sui Wenjing (born 18 July 1995) is a Chinese pair skater. With partner Han Cong, she is the 2022 Olympic gold medalist, 2018 Olympic silver medalist, a two-time world champion (2017, 2019), a three-time world silver medalist (2015, 2016, 2021), the 2019–20 Grand Prix Final champion, a six-time Four Continents champion (2012, 2014, 2016–2017, 2019–2020), a three-time World Junior champion (2010–2012),  the 2009–10 Junior Grand Prix Final champion, and a two-time Chinese national champion (2010, 2011). Sui and Han are the first pair skate team to achieve a Super Slam, having won all major competitions in both their senior and junior career. They are the only team that has landed throw quadruple salchows and quadruple twists in competition.

Career
Sui and Han teamed up in 2007 without having previous pair skating experience. They both were inspired by 2010 Olympic Champions Shen Xue and Hongbo Zhao and started skating after watching them competing in the 2002 Winter Olympics.

Junior career

2009–10 Season: First world junior title
Sui and Han made their international debut in the 2009–10 ISU Junior Grand Prix, where they won the gold medal in their two events. They went on to win the gold medal at the ISU Junior Grand Prix Final. They then won the 2010 Chinese Figure Skating Championships and earned a trip to the 2010 World Junior Figure Skating Championships, where they won the gold medal. They became the second Chinese pair to win the World Junior Figure Skating Championships after Zhang Dan & Zhang Hao, who won the title in 2001 and 2003.

Senior career

2010–11 season: Second world junior title

Sui and Han started their season by winning the silver medal at the Junior Grand Prix Cup of Austria and the gold medal at the Junior Grand Prix Blauen Schwerter.

The pair also debuted on the Senior Grand Prix series by winning a silver medal at the 2010 Cup of China. They won the bronze medal at their second Grand Prix event, 2010 Skate America. At the 2010–11 Grand Prix Final in December 2010, Sui and Han scored 61.49 in the short program, setting a new personal best and a personal best of 117.55 points in the free skate to win a bronze medal with 179.04 overall. The pair then went on to win their second national title at the 2011 Chinese Figure Skating Championships.

At the 2011 World Junior Figure Skating Championships, Sui and Han won their second world junior title.

2011–12 season: First Four Continents title and third world junior title
Sui and Han started their season off by winning the Junior Grand Prix Volvo Cup and the Junior Grand Prix Cup of Austria. They went on to win their second Junior Grand Prix title at the 2011–12 ISU Junior Grand Prix.

On the senior level, Sui and Han were assigned to compete at the 2011 Skate Canada, where they took the silver medal, and the 2011 Cup of China, where they finished 5th. Sui and Han competed at the 2012 Four Continents Championships and won the gold medal placing 1st in both the short and free skate. They won their third consecutive world junior title at the 2012 World Junior Championships held in Minsk, Belarus.

2012–13 season
Sui and Han withdrew from the Grand Prix series due to an injury to Sui. They competed at the 2013 World Championships despite Sui still being injured and placed twelfth.

After the season concluded, they switched from longtime coach Luan Bo to Olympic pairs champion Zhao Hongbo, Han Bing, and Yao Bin.

2013–14 season: Second Four Continents title
Sui and Han were assigned to two Grand Prix events and began their season at 2013 Skate Canada, where they won the silver medal. At the 2013 NHK Trophy, they won the bronze medal behind teammates Peng/Zhang. They won the bronze medal at the National Championships but did not make the 2014 Olympic team. They then competed at the 2014 Four Continents Championships and won the gold medal setting a new personal best overall score of 212.40 points.

Sui and Han then competed at the 2014 World Championships after the withdrawal of Pang/Tong, where they finished sixth after placing fourth in the short program with a score of 72.24 and ninth in the free skate with a score of 119.86, with a total score of 192.10.

2014–15 season: World silver medal
Sui and Han were assigned to two Grand Prix events. At 2014 Skate Canada, Sui and Han won the silver medal after placing second in both segments with scores of 65.22 in the short program, 119.42 in the free skate, and a total score of 184.64. At 2014 Trophee Eric Bompard, Sui and Han won another silver medal after placing second in the short program with a score of 67.27 and second in the free skate with a score of 133.41, for a total score of 200.68. These results qualified them for the 2014–15 Grand Prix Final, where they won the second Grand Prix Final bronze medal of their career. They placed 3rd in the short program with a score of 66.66 and 5th in the free skate with a score of 127.65, for a total score of 194.31.

At the 2015 Four Continents Figure Skating Championships, Sui and Han finished fourth with a total score of 198.88 after placing third in the short program with a score of 69.19 and fourth in the free skate with a score of 129.69. At the 2015 World Figure Skating Championships, Sui and Han won the silver medal. They placed third in the short program with a score of 71.63, second in the free skate with a personal best score of 142.49, and earned a personal best combined total score of 214.12.

Sui and Han stated they would begin training the throw quad Salchow again for the 2015–16 season.

2015–16 season: Second world silver medal

For the Grand Prix season, Sui and Han were assigned to compete at 2015 Skate America and 2015 Cup of China. They began their season by winning Skate America, their first senior Grand Prix gold medal. Sui was injured in early November, shortly before the Cup of China, where they won the silver medal. These results qualified them to the 2015–16 Grand Prix of Figure Skating Final, from which they withdrew due to Sui's injury.

Sui and Han won the 2016 Four Continents Championships with 221.91 points. At the 2016 World Championships, they won the silver medal. They placed first in the short program, second in the free skating, and second overall, behind Canada's Meagan Duhamel and Eric Radford.

2016–17 season: First world title
Sui underwent surgery on both feet following the 2015–16 season. Sui and Han then withdrew from the Grand Prix series because the recovery from the surgery took several months.

They made their season debut at the 2017 Four Continents Championships, where they won the gold medal with a new personal best score of 225.03 points. Their free skate included a quadruple twist.

At the 2017 World Figure Skating Championships in Helsinki, Finland, Sui and Han won their first World title, placing first in both the short program and free skate.

2017–18 season: Pyeongchang Olympics
Sui and Han competed on the Grand Prix series at the Cup of China and NHK Trophy. They won the gold medal in both events and qualified to the Grand Prix Final. At the Final, they won the silver medal after placing third in the short program and second in the free skate.

Sui cut her lower leg near the shinbone in training before the 2018 Four Continents Championships and consequently withdrew.

Sui and Han did not compete in the team event at the 2018 Winter Olympics. In the pairs event, they placed first in the short program, third in the free skating, and second overall, losing the gold by only 0.43 overall to Aliona Savchenko and Bruno Massot, who came from fourth after the short to win.

It was revealed that Sui's right foot injury at the Olympics was a stress fracture. As a result, the team withdrew from the 2018 World Championships.

2018–19 season: Second World title
Choreographer Lori Nichol, in designing the team's free program for the season, picked Ezio Bosso's "Rain, In Your Black Eyes", feeling that Bosso's own personal struggles connected to Sui's previous struggles with injury.  Sui and Han were initially assigned to compete at the new 2018 Grand Prix of Helsinki and 2018 NHK Trophy for the Grand Prix, but withdrew from both events due to Sui's continued injury recovery.  They competed in the short program at the 2019 Chinese Championships but withdrew afterward, having not planned to compete in the free skate.

Sui and Han returned to international competition at the 2019 Four Continents Championships. Sui fell on her attempted triple toe loop, relegating them narrowly to second place behind Moore-Towers/Marinaro of Canada in the short program.  Sui attributed the error to being "a little too excited" by the return to competition.  Sui/Han then won the free skate, and their fifth overall Four Continents gold, despite a second fall from Sui on the side-by-side triple Salchow.  They finished 0.06 points ahead of Moore-Towers/Marinaro.  Both said that they needed more time to become familiar with their program in order to improve.

At the 2019 World Championships, Sui and Han won their second world title, skating two clean programs and setting personal bests in both segments of the competition. They scored 79.24 points in the short program, which stood as a world record until the pair of Tarasova/Morozov broke it later the same day. In the free skate, Sui and Han placed first with a score of 155.60, a new world record. Their total score of 234.84 points was also a new world record. They outscored silver medalists Tarasova/Morozov by 6.37 points. Han commented: "Thank you to the audience that supported us so well. We also want to show our appreciation to our team and the coaches. This season we had to overcome a lot of difficulties, but thanks to their support, we were able to overcome it."

2019–20 season: First Grand Prix Final title
Sui and Han started their season at the Cup of China, placing first in the short program with a personal best of 80.90 under the new +5 GOE system.  They won the free skate as well, with Han doubling a planned triple Salchow as the only error, and received an overall score of 228.37.  Han attributed the mistake to recovery from injury over the summer.  At the 2019 NHK Trophy, Sui/Han set a new world record in the short program.  They won the free skate as well, despite Sui falling on the opening to their jump combination, taking their second Grand Prix gold medal of the season and qualifying to the Grand Prix Final in first position.

At the Grand Prix Final, Sui/Han won their first Grand Prix Final title. They placed first in the short program despite Sui putting a hand down on their throw jump.  They were second in the free skate despite Han's errors on both their planned jumping passes and a few lost levels on lifts and their combination spin.  They were the first Chinese team to win the Grand Prix Final since their coach Zhao Hongbo, and his wife Shen Xue did so eleven seasons earlier.

The favorites heading into the 2020 Four Continents Championships in Seoul, Sui/Han placed third in the short program after inadvertently performing only a throw double flip.  Sui attributed this to her costume.  Winning the free skate despite errors on their side-by-side triple Salchows, they won their sixth Four Continents title. Speaking afterward, Sui said that training had been difficult recently due to concerns about whether they would be able to travel abroad because of the coronavirus pandemic.  Han said they were "quite satisfied" with their performance.  They were assigned to compete at the World Championships in Montreal, but these were cancelled as a result of the coronavirus pandemic.

2020–21 season: Third World silver
With the COVID-19 pandemic continuing to affect international travel, Sui/Han were assigned to compete at the 2020 Cup of China after the ISU opted to assign the Grand Prix based primarily on geographic location.  They withdrew from the event due to Han undergoing hip surgery over the summer.

Due to the lack of prior appearances during the season, Sui/Han were considered to be dark horses going into the 2021 World Championships in Stockholm. In the short program, Sui stepped out of her attempted triple toe loop, and the team placed second in the segment, slightly more than 2 points behind Boikova/Kozlovskii and just less than 2 points ahead of Mishina/Galliamov. In the free skate both made jump errors, placing them second in the segment and the silver medalists overall, while Mishina/Galliamov leapfrogged them to take the gold medal. Assessing their performance, Sui noted that they had only two months of training beforehand, calling them at "70%–80% of our best selves, I would say. We did think we achieved a huge accomplishment within only two months."

2021–22 season: Beijing Olympics
Sui/Han won the gold medal at the 2021 Asian Open, the Olympic test event, to open their season. At their first Grand Prix event, 2021 Skate Canada International,  they won the gold medal, defeating silver medalists Pavliuchenko/Khodykin by 30.97 points. Sui/Han's second Grand Prix event was initially the 2021 Cup of China, but following its cancellation, they were reassigned to the 2021 Gran Premio d'Italia. Competing in their second Grand Prix in as many weeks, they easily won the event, defeating silver medalists Peng/Jin by 12.69 points and becoming the first pair team to qualify to the 2021–22 Grand Prix Final. Discussing their revival of their successful "Bridge Over Troubled Water" program, Sui expressed the hope that "it can be a bridge for everyone to connect in these times." The Grand Prix Final was subsequently cancelled due to restrictions prompted by the Omicron variant.

Named to the Chinese Olympic team for their home Olympics in Beijing, Sui/Han began the event as the Chinese entry in the pairs' short program of the Olympic team event. Skating cleanly, they won the segment with a world record score of 82.83, 0.19 points ahead of Russian rivals Mishina/Galliamov. They did not skate in the free skate segment of the event, and Team China ultimately finished in fifth place. In the pairs event, they skated another clean short program and set another world record of 84.41. Addressing Russians Tarasova/Morozov, who finished second and 0.16 points behind, Sui called them "our friends and competitors," adding, "this is something we are very proud of, because we can maintain this high level of competition between the two pairs, and it has been more than ten years." In the free skate, Sui/Han attempted a quad twist in competition for the first time in four years, seeking to compensate for their weaker jump elements. Sui's triple Salchow attempt was ruled downgraded, but they still won the free skate and took the gold medal over Tarasova/Morozov and Mishina/Galliamov. Han said, "our dream finally came true.", having become the second Chinese skaters to win Olympic gold. With their Olympic Gold medal win, they became the first pair team to achieve the Super Slam. Despite being the Olympic champions, Sui and Han did not participate in the 2022 World Figure Skating Championships.

Programs

Competitive highlights

GP: Grand Prix; JGP: Junior Grand Prix

With Han

Detailed results
(Small medals for short and free programs awarded only at ISU Championships – Worlds and Four Continents. At team events, medals awarded for team results only.)

With Han

References

External links

1995 births
Living people
Chinese female pair skaters
Figure skaters from Harbin
Four Continents Figure Skating Championships medalists
World Junior Figure Skating Championships medalists
Age controversies
Asian Games medalists in figure skating
Figure skaters at the 2011 Asian Winter Games
Asian Games silver medalists for China
Medalists at the 2011 Asian Winter Games
Figure skaters at the 2018 Winter Olympics
Figure skaters at the 2022 Winter Olympics
Olympic figure skaters of China
Olympic gold medalists for China
Olympic silver medalists for China
Medalists at the 2018 Winter Olympics
Medalists at the 2022 Winter Olympics
Olympic medalists in figure skating
World Figure Skating Championships medalists